Frumoasa  is a commune in Harghita County, Romania. It lies in the Székely Land, an ethno-cultural region in eastern Transylvania.

Component villages 
The commune is composed of four villages:

History 

The first written mention of the village is from 1567 as Zepwyz. In 1602 it was recorded as Szépviz ("beautiful water"). Its original Romanian name derived from the Hungarian toponym as Ciuc-Sepviz which was Romanianized to its current official name in 1919.

According to tradition, the village's original name was Szépmező. According to Balázs Orbán, it was founded during the reign of László I as a community of border guards for the defense of the Ghimeș pass, on the eastern border of the Kingdom of Hungary. The Roman Catholic chapel was built before 1694 by the Bíró family. The Roman Catholic church was built in 1892.

The village administratively belonged to Csíkszék, then, from 1876 until 1918 to the Csík County in the Kingdom of Hungary. After World War I, by the terms of the Treaty of Trianon of 1920, it became part of Romania. As a result of the Second Vienna Award, it belonged to Hungary again between 1940 and 1944. After World War II, it came under Romanian administration and became part of Romania in 1947. Between 1952 and 1960, it formed part of the Hungarian Autonomous Province; it then formed part of the Mureș-Hungarian Autonomous Province until it was abolished in 1968. Since then, the commune has been part of Harghita County.

Demographics
At the 2011 census, the commune had a population of 3,682; out of them, 94% were Hungarian, 2.3% were Romanian and 1.7% were Roma.

The village of Făgățel has a significant population of ethnic Romanians, numbering 64 of the village's 130 inhabitants.

Natives include Piroska Abos.

Tourist attractions 

Saint Gregory the Illuminator Armenian Church
'Snowy' Virgin Mary Catholic Parish Church
 Ruins of the St. Ladislaus Gothic chapel on Pagan Mountain
 Biró-Chapel (Craftsmen's Chapel)
 Ski track

Twin cities 
  Újkígyós, Hungary

Gallery

References

Communes in Harghita County
Localities in Transylvania
Székely communities